Armando Leyson Castro (born 28 September 1956) is a Mexican politician affiliated with the Institutional Revolutionary Party. As of 2014 he served as Deputy of the LIX Legislature of the Mexican Congress representing Sinaloa. He was Municipal President of Guasave from 1999 to 2001.

References

1956 births
Living people
Politicians from Sinaloa
People from Guasave
Institutional Revolutionary Party politicians
21st-century Mexican politicians
Municipal presidents in Sinaloa
Deputies of the LIX Legislature of Mexico
Members of the Chamber of Deputies (Mexico) for Sinaloa